WAVT-FM (101.9 MHz) is a commercial FM radio station licensed to Pottsville, Pennsylvania, and calling itself "T-102."  It is owned by Pottsville Broadcasting Company and broadcasts a Contemporary Hit Radio/Hot Adult Contemporary radio format. The station also broadcasts local high school sports and Penn State Nittany Lions football.  Each weekend it carries "Rick Dees Weekly Top 40,"  the "Remix Top30 with Hollywood Hamilton" and the "Carson Daly Download."

WAVT-FM has an effective radiated power (ERP) of 29,000 watts.  The transmitter is on Swatara Road in Shenandoah Heights.

History
The Federal Communications Commission granted Pottsville Broadcasting Company a construction permit for a new FM station on December 26, 1946. The company already owned WPPA 1360 AM, so the new station was given the WPPA-FM call sign.

At first it simulcast WPPA, but by the 1970s, it was broadcasting its own automated easy listening format.  With the change, it switched its call letters to WAVT-FM.

Signal note
WAVT-FM is short-spaced to three other Class B stations:

References

External links
 

AVT-FM
Radio stations established in 1946
1948 establishments in Pennsylvania